Gabriel Izquier Artiles (born 29 April 1993), commonly known as Gabri, is a Spanish footballer who plays for Maltese club Hibernians F.C. as a defender.

Club career
Born in Las Palmas, Canary Islands, Gabri graduated from RCD Mallorca's youth system, and made his senior debuts with the reserves in 2010, while still a junior. In the 2012 summer he was loaned to CD Llosetense, returning to the Bermellones in the following year.

Gabri made his first team debut on 7 June 2015, starting in a 0–2 away loss against CD Mirandés in the Segunda División championship. On 3 August, he moved to Segunda División B side Barakaldo CF.

On 16 August 2016 Gabri signed for another reserve team, 
Atlético Levante UD also in the third tier.

References

External links

1993 births
Living people
Footballers from Las Palmas
Spanish footballers
Spanish expatriate footballers
Association football defenders
Segunda División players
Segunda División B players
Tercera División players
Maltese Premier League players
RCD Mallorca B players
RCD Mallorca players
Barakaldo CF footballers
Atlético Levante UD players
CD Badajoz players
CD Llosetense players
Spanish expatriate sportspeople in Malta
Expatriate footballers in Malta